Generation Axe are an American rock/heavy metal supergroup formed by Steve Vai in 2016. They toured North America in April and May 2016, and Asia in April 2017. Another North American tour took place in November and December 2018, and another short Asian tour in November 2019.

Members
 Steve Vai
 Zakk Wylde (Black Label Society, Ozzy Osbourne Band)
 Yngwie Malmsteen (Yngwie Malmsteen's Rising Force)
 Nuno Bettencourt (Extreme, Mourning Widows)
 Tosin Abasi (Animals as Leaders, T.R.A.M)

 Bass – Pete Griffin (Dweezil Zappa, Stanley Clarke, Edgar Winter) 
 Keyboards – Nick Marinovich (aka Nick Z. Marino) (Yngwie Malmsteen) (North American tours); Derek Sherinian (Dream Theater, Sons of Apollo) (Asian tour)
 Drums – JP Bouvet (Dave MacKay, Drew of the Drew)

Tour dates

North America (2016)

Asia (2017)

North America (2018)

Asia (2019)

Setlist

North America (2016)

Discography
 Generation Axe — The Guitars That Destroyed the World: Live In China (2019)

References

External links
 

Heavy metal supergroups
Musical groups established in 2016
2016 establishments in the United States